Gregoire Lake is a lake in Alberta, Canada. It is part of the Athabasca River basin.

It is located in the wetlands of northern Alberta, adjacent to Highway 881, between Fort McMurray and Lac La Biche.  It was known as "Willow Lake" until 1940 when the name was changed to "Gregoire Lake".

Gregoire Lake Provincial Park is established on the northern shore of the lake, which is a traditional territory of Woodland Cree and Chipewyan First Nations.

See also
List of lakes in Alberta

References

Lakes of Alberta
Regional Municipality of Wood Buffalo